Jeffrey Donald Palmer is a Distinguished Professor of Biology at Indiana University Bloomington.

Education
Palmer was educated at Swarthmore College and completed his PhD at Stanford University on the evolution of chloroplast DNA supervised by Winslow Briggs in 1982.

Career and research
Palmer's research investigates molecular evolution, molecular phylogenetics and comparative genomics.  his laboratory studies the evolution of genes and genomes particularly in the chloroplast, mitochondrial DNA and during horizontal gene transfer.

His former doctoral students include Thomas D. Bruns, a Professor at the University of California, Berkeley. His former postdocs include Patrick J. Keeling, and Kenneth H. Wolfe, and Mark Wayne Chase.

Awards and honours
Palmer was awarded membership of the National Academy of Sciences in 2000 in recognition of his “distinguished and continuing achievements in original research” and the McClintock Prize in 2016 for his studies of plant genome structure, function and evolution. He was elected a Fellow of the American Academy of Arts and Sciences (FAAAS) in 1999.

References

Living people
American bioinformaticians
Fellows of the American Academy of Arts and Sciences
Members of the United States National Academy of Sciences
Year of birth missing (living people)
Fellows of the American Association for the Advancement of Science